Juan Carlos Azócar Segura (born 1 October 1995) is a Venezuelan professional footballer who currently plays for San Antonio FC on loan from Deportivo La Guaira.

Career

Urartu
On 1 September 2019, Azócar joined Urartu on loan from Deportivo La Guaira for the remainder of the 2019–20 season

Rio Grande Valley
On 28 August 2020, Azócar joined USL Championship side Rio Grande Valley FC on loan from his parent club Deportivo La Guaira, with an option to make the deal permanent. He made his debut for the club on 30 September 2020, starting in a 2–0 win over Austin Bold.

Oakland Roots
On 11 March 2022, Azócar joined USL Championship side Oakland Roots on loan  ahead of their 2022 season. He left Oakland following their 2022 season.

San Antonio FC
On 23 December 2022, it was confirmed that Azócar would play on loan with San Antonio FC for the 2023 season in the USL Championship.

References

External links
 

1995 births
Association football forwards
Carabobo F.C. players
Deportivo La Guaira players
Deportivo Táchira F.C. players
Expatriate footballers in Armenia
Expatriate soccer players in the United States
FC Urartu players
Living people
Oakland Roots SC players
Rio Grande Valley FC Toros players
San Antonio FC players
USL Championship players
Venezuelan expatriate footballers
Venezuelan expatriate sportspeople in the United States
Venezuelan footballers
Venezuela under-20 international footballers
Venezuelan Primera División players
Sportspeople from Maracay